Hu Xiaoyuan (born 1977, Heilongjiang, China) is a contemporary Chinese artist. Hu's work has been exhibited internationally and her practice includes installation, video, sculpture and painting. Hu currently lives in Beijing, China.

Hu's work often addresses themes and topics related to time, space, consciousness, and existence and draw upon specific and personal experiences. Her work has been collected by a number of institutions including Hammer Museum, Los Angeles; M+, Hong Kong, and Power Station of Art, Shanghai. Notable exhibitions that Hu has been featured in include The Great Acceleration, Taipei Biennial (Taipei, 2014), group exhibition The Ungovernables, New Museum Triennial (New York, 2012), and Documenta 12 (Kassel, 2007).

Early life and education
Hu was born in Harbin, China, in 1977. Her mother was an accountant in a state-owned company. At twelve, her mother employed a tutor to teach Hu drawing and painting. Hu studied communication design at the Central Academy of Fine Arts in China, graduating in 2002.

Career 
Following her graduation, Hu continued to make art. In October 2003, Hu began exhibiting with N12, a circle of twelve likely-minded artists who were all recent graduates of Central Academy of Fine Arts. N12 was established when artist Song Kun assembled a group of young artists to exhibit together. The first exhibition from the group was focused on the painting medium, a commonality of their artistic practices—the theme, painting to the nth dimension, led to the group's name, N12 and first exhibition, N12 No.1 at the Central Academy of Fine Arts Gallery in 2003.

In 2007, Hu became the first female Chinese artist to participate in Documenta. She presented her work, A keepsake I cannot give away, 2005. Since 2010, Hu has been collaborating with Beijing Commune, a gallery featuring contemporary Chinese artists that represents her.

Hu began working on a trilogy of solo exhibitions in 2015, beginning with Ant Bone, at Beijing Commune. In Ant Bone, Hu explores contradiction and tension, taking inspiration from the ant—an insect of minuscule size but incredible strength, with a tough exoskeleton but delicate frame. In Grass Thorn, the second exhibition in 2017, Hu addresses existence and ephemerality. Her works in the exhibition are subject to erosion and progression over time.

In 2019, Hu was shortlisted for the inaugural Sigg Prize established by M+ in Hong Kong.

Solo exhibitions
2017 – Grass Thorn, Beijing Commune, Beijing, China
2015 – Ant Bone, Beijing Commune, Beijing, China
2013 – A Potent Force: Duan Jianyu and Hu Xiaoyuan, Rockbund Art Museum, Shanghai, China
2012 – No Fruit at the Root, Beijing Commune, Beijing, China
2011 – Summer Solstice, Micheal Ku Gallery, Taipei, Taiwan
2010 – Hu Xiaoyuan, Beijing Commune, Beijing, China

Selected group exhibitions
2015 – My Generation: Young Chinese Artists, Orange County Museum of Art, Orange County, U.S.
2014 – Inside, Palais de Tokyo, Paris, France
2014 – Focus Beijing: De Heus-Zomer Collection, Museum Boijmans Van Beuningen, Rotterdam, the Netherlands
2014 – My Generation: Young Chinese Artists, Tampa Museum of Art, Museum of Fine Arts, St. Petersburg, Florida, U.S.A
2013 – Art Statement, Art Basel, Basel, Switzerland
2012 – Unfinished Country-Chinese Video Exhibition, Contemporary Arts Museum Houston, Houston, U.S.A
2012 – The Ungovernables – 2012 New Museum Triennial, New Museum, New York, U.S.A
2011 – In a Perfect World, Meulensteen Gallery, New York, U.S.A
2010 – Beijing Voice-Annual Project, Pace Gallery/Beijing, Beijing, China
2010 – Negotiations-The Second Today's Documents, Today Art Museum, Beijing, China
2010 – Traile, Boers-Li Gallery, Beijing, China
2008 – Ego Documents-The Autobiographical in Contemporary Art, Kunstmuseum Bern, Bern, Switzerland
2008 – Sprout from White Nights, Bonniers Konsthall, Stockholm, Sweden. 
2008 – Red Aside: Contemporary Chinese art from the Sigg Collection, Fundació Joan Miró Museum, Barcelona, Spain
2007 – Documenta Kassel 12, Kassel, Germany. 
2007 – China Welcomes You..., Kunsthaus Graz Museum, Graz, Austria
2006 – Asia Contemporary Art Exhibition, Guang Ju, Korea
2005 – Mahjong-Contemporary Chinese Art from the Sigg Collection, Kunst Museum, Switzerland
2004 – N12 New Painting-No.2, Art Museum of the Central Academy of Fine Arts, Beijing, China
2003 – N12 New Painting-No.1, Art Museum of the Central Academy of Fine Arts, Beijing, China

References

External links
 
  Frieze.com review
 bonnierskonsthall.se interview
 yishu-online.com interview

1977 births
Living people
Artists from Heilongjiang
Central Academy of Fine Arts alumni
Chinese contemporary artists